Marco Weymans (born 9 July 1997) is a professional football player. Born in Belgium, Weymans represents the Burundi national team.

Club career
Having begun his career with Beerschot and PSV, Weymans spent time on trial with Fulham before signing for Welsh side Cardiff City in 2015 on a three-year contract.

He joined Tubize in 2017 and made his Belgian First Division B debut for the side on 20 August 2017 in a game against Beerschot Wilrijk. And in 2020 is beginning the senior Burundi

International career
Weymans was born in Belgium to a Belgian father and Burundian mother. Weymans represented Belgium at several youth levels, the last being at under-19 level. He scored one goal for the side, from the halfway line during a match against Sweden in March 2015.

Weymans debuted for the Burundi national team in a 1–1 2021 Africa Cup of Nations qualification tie with Mauritania on 11 November 2020.

References

External links
 
 

1997 births
Living people
Burundian footballers
People from Mouscron
Footballers from Hainaut (province)
Burundi international footballers
Belgian footballers
Beerschot A.C. players
PSV Eindhoven players
Cardiff City F.C. players
A.F.C. Tubize players
Östersunds FK players
Challenger Pro League players
Allsvenskan players
Belgian expatriate footballers
Expatriate footballers in the Netherlands
Expatriate footballers in Wales
Expatriate footballers in Sweden
Belgian expatriate sportspeople in the Netherlands
Belgian expatriate sportspeople in Wales
Belgian expatriate sportspeople in Sweden
Burundian expatriate sportspeople in the Netherlands
Burundian expatriate sportspeople in Wales
Burundian expatriate sportspeople in Sweden
Association football defenders
Association football midfielders
Belgium youth international footballers
Burundian people of Belgian descent
Belgian people of Burundian descent